Frank Ifield is an album by country and pop singer Frank Ifield with Norrie Paramor and his orchestra issued on the World Record Club label. This label sold albums by mail order which made this album rather obscure and probably rare as very few references to it can be found on the Internet. His album “Blue Skies” was also issued on this label as well as on the Columbia label in 1963. The label was taken over by EMI in 1965 but continued to be used as a sub-label for mail order, covering a wide range of musical genres, and distributing in South Africa, Australia and New Zealand. There is no production date on the record sleeve or label but the album notes state it was his second album after his first Columbia album “I’ll Remember You” released early in 1963.

Track listing

Side 1
"My Kind of Girl” (Bricusse)
"He'll Have to Go" (J. Allison/A. Allison)
"I Can’t Get Enough of Your Kisses” (Stone)
"Cold Cold Heart" (Williams)
"Daybreak" (Grafé/Adamson)
"Love Song of the Waterfall" (Barnes/Winge/Nolan)
"Wolverton Mountain" (Kilgore/King)

Side 2
"Cattle Call" (Owens)
"Half as Much" (C. Williams)
"Please" (Robin/Ranger)
"Funny How Time Slips Away" (Nelson)
"Riders in the Sky" (Jones)
”I'd Be a Legend in My Time” (Gibson)
”Scarlet Ribbons (for Her Hair)” (Segal/Danzig)

Personnel

Tracks 3 & 5 of side 1 arranged and conducted by Johnny Hawkins.

References

1963 albums
Frank Ifield albums